Jewell Junction, better known as Jewell, is a city in Hamilton County, Iowa, United States. The population was 1,216 at the time of the 2020 census.

History
Jewell Junction was platted in 1880. It was named for D. T. Jewell, the original owner of the town site. A post office called Jewell has been in operation since 1880.

Geography
Jewell Junction is located at  (42.307546, -93.641121).

Nearby Anderson Goose Lake is a National Natural Landmark.

Demographics

2010 census
As of the census of 2010, there were 1,215 people, 478 households, and 336 families living in the city. The racial makeup of the city was 95.2% White, 0.1% African American, 1.2% Asian, 2.2% from other races, and 1.3% from two or more races. Hispanic or Latino of any race were 4.4% of the population.

There were 478 households, of which 36.0% had children under the age of 18 living with them, 56.7% were married couples living together, 9.8% had a female householder with no husband present, 3.8% had a male householder with no wife present, and 29.7% were non-families. 25.9% of all households were made up of individuals, and 10.2% had someone living alone who was 65 years of age or older. The average household size was 2.54 and the average family size was 3.08.

The median age in the city was 39.3 years. 29.3% of residents were under the age of 18; 4.5% were between the ages of 18 and 24; 25.1% were from 25 to 44; 27.8% were from 45 to 64; and 13.3% were 65 years of age or older. The gender makeup of the city was 49.6% male and 50.4% female.

2000 census
As of the census of 2000, there were 1,239 people, 475 households, and 341 families living in the city. The racial makeup of the city was 96.53% White, 0.08% African American, 0.16% Native American, 1.94% Asian, 0.48% from other races, and 0.81% from two or more races. Hispanic or Latino of any race were 1.21% of the population.

There were 475 households, out of which 37.5% had children under the age of 18 living with them, 62.9% were married couples living together, 4.8% had a female householder with no husband present, and 28.2% were non-families. 24.0% of all households were made up of individuals, and 12.6% had someone living alone who was 65 years of age or older. The average household size was 2.58 and the average family size was 3.09.

29.4% were under the age of 18, 5.0% from 18 to 24, 30.5% from 25 to 44, 20.8% from 45 to 64, and 14.3% were 65 years of age or older. The median age was 36 years. For every 100 females, there were 106.2 males. For every 100 females age 18 and over, there were 97.1 males.

The median income for a household in the city was $42,614, and the median income for a family was $50,139. Males had a median income of $32,042 versus $25,323 for females. The per capita income for the city was $18,780. About 1.4% of families and 4.4% of the population were below the poverty line, including 5.5% of those under age 18 and 5.0% of those age 65 or over.

Education
Jewell is home to the South Hamilton Community School District, which serves Jewell, Ellsworth, Stanhope, and Randall.

References

External links

 

Cities in Iowa
Cities in Hamilton County, Iowa